Allan Marshall Dailey (born 8 May 1908, date of death unknown) was a Scottish professional golfer. He won the Roehampton Invitation in 1933 and was subsequently selected for the 1933 Ryder Cup but didn't play in any matches. He finished in a tie for 4th place in the 1938 Open Championship. He was from a golfing family. His father James Russell Dailey was a professional golfer as was his brother Russell.

Tournament wins (3)
This list may be incomplete
1933 Roehampton Invitation
1935 Dunlop-Southern Tournament
1948 News Chronicle Tournament (tie with Reg Horne)

Results in major championships

Note: Dailey only played in The Open Championship.

NT = No tournament
CUT = missed the half-way cut
"T" indicates a tie for a place

Team appearances
Ryder Cup (representing Great Britain): 1933 (winners)
England–Scotland Professional Match (representing Scotland): 1932, 1933, 1934, 1935, 1936, 1938
Llandudno International Golf Trophy (representing Scotland): 1938

References

Scottish male golfers
Ryder Cup competitors for Europe
Sportspeople from Fife
1908 births
Year of death missing